Rhabdotites is an extinct genus of sea cucumbers which existed in Poland during the Triassic period. It contains the species Rhabdotites mortenseni and Rhabdotites rectus.

References

Stichopitidae
Prehistoric sea cucumber genera
Triassic echinoderms
Fossils of Poland
Fossil taxa described in 1952